The Ministry of Information was the Government of France department responsible for propaganda from its creation in 1938 to its suppression in 1974. It was headed by the Minister of Information, occasionally taking various titles.

History

Minister

Organization

Notes

References 

Government ministries of France